Io piaccio (also known as La via del successo... con le donne) is a 1955 Italian comedy film directed by Giorgio Bianchi.

Plot 
Professor Maldi, a researcher on the company held by Commendatore Tassinetti (Aldo Fabrizi), experiments on various animals, and especially on the capon Gildo, its preparation which should give courage to the men. Pressed by Tassinetti Maldi decides to experiment on himself the latest version of its compound, without waiting to know the reaction of the capon.

Soon, the shy Maldi finds himself desired by every woman he meets: rather than courage, his discovery provides an irresistible fascination for twenty-four hours.

Cast 

 Walter Chiari: Prof. Roberto Maldi 
 Aldo Fabrizi: Commendatore Tassinetti 
 Peppino De Filippo: Nicolino Donati
 Dorian Gray: Doriana Paris 
 Bianca Maria Fusari: Sandra, Maldi's assistant  
 Tina Pica: Sibilla 
 Mario Carotenuto: Marassino 
 Sandra Mondaini:Giovanna
 Lina Volonghi: Lucia, Tassinetti's wife  
 Valeria Fabrizi: Wardrobe supervisor
 Enrico Glori: Butler at Caprice nightclub 
 Riccardo Billi: Husband
 Erminio Spalla: Doriana's confidence man
 Bruno Corelli: Director
 Dina Perbellini: Marassino's wife

References

External links

1955 films
Italian science fiction comedy films
Films directed by Giorgio Bianchi
1950s science fiction comedy films
Films scored by Nino Rota
1955 comedy films
Italian black-and-white films
1950s Italian films